The Homeland is an album by Chicago-based rocker Bobby Conn and his backing band, the Glass Gypsies released on January 20, 2004 on Thrill Jockey records.  It is noteworthy for taking a more openly political approach than any of Conn's previous albums, being particularly critical of George Bush and the Iraq War. Musically the album focuses mostly on a number of 70s styles, from early-decade prog pseudo-symphonies to late decade disco-rock fusion and funk. The album was recorded at Soma Studios, Chicago, Illinois in 2003.

Reception

The Homeland was met with mostly positive reviews. The Columbus FreePress gave it a glowing review, writing "It is rare when an album sets out to achieve such lofty goals as The Homeland. It’s even more rare when the artist actually hits the mark on all levels." Uncut magazine gave the album 4/5 stars, calling Conn "witty and sharp", and stating that he can "tell a tale with aplomb". Mojo also awarded the album 4/5 stars, and  Q Magazine awarded the album 3/5 stars, saying "[I]t's reassuring to run into the real McCoy. Chicago's Bobby Conn is just that."

On the negative side, Dave Queen of Stylus Magazine, stated that the album "fails" in comparison to its predecessor, criticising John McEntire's production and Conn's subject matter, stating "I [...] miss the dysfunctional coke-sex ballads [i.e. of "The Golden Age"]". Playlouder gave the album 2.5/5 stars, mostly criticising the album's political lyrical content, and asserting that "the results are anticlimactic"- however reviewer Jeremy Allen does admit that Conn "is clearly talented.". PopMatters criticised the political lyrics as "crude and oversimplified" but admitted that "there are still plenty of killer hooks, and John McEntire's expert recording job makes the most of them, giving the mix a crisp clarity that assures that these intricate arrangements never sound decadently bloated."

Track listing

 "We Come in Peace"
 "Homeland"
 "Laugh Track (instrumental)
 "We're Taking Over the World"
 "Shopping" (instrumental)
 "Relax"
 "Home Sweet Home"
 "Style I Need"
 "Cashing Objections"
 "Doctor & Nurse" (instrumental)
 "Bus No. 243"
 "Independence
 "My Special Friend"
 "Ordinary Violence"

The Japanese import contains one bonus track, entitled "Got To Get It."

Personnel
 Bobby Conn - vocals, guitar
 Sledd - guitar
 Monica BouBou - organ
 Pearly Sweets - keyboards
 Nick Macri - bass
 the fudge - drums

Footnotes

2004 albums
Bobby Conn albums
Thrill Jockey albums